Keightley Way is a southwestern road and tunnel in the British Overseas Territory of Gibraltar. It connects Rosia Road at Little Bay to the Ibrahim-al-Ibrahim Mosque and Nun's Well at Europa Point. Dug in 1960, it was the last surface tunnel to be built in Gibraltar. The tunnel was designed to take a two lane road and space for pedestrians, although it now only carries one lane of traffic southbound. It was named after General Sir Charles Keightley who was the Governor of Gibraltar at the time.

References

Streets in Gibraltar
Tunnels in Gibraltar
Road tunnels